The Doubles' sprint race of the 2017 FIL World Luge Championships was held on 27 January 2017.

Results
A qualification was held to determine the 15 participants. The qualification run was started at 10:25 and the final run at 14:22.

References

Doubles' sprint